Springhead Motorshark is the fourth and most recent studio album by the glam metal band Britny Fox. It was released in 2003 on Spitfire Records.

Track list

Personnel
Band members
Tommy Paris - lead and backing vocals, guitar, keyboards, producer, mixing
Michael Kelly Smith - lead and rhythm guitars, bass, mandolin, percussion, lead and backing vocals, producer, engineer, mixing
Billy Childs - bass, rhythm guitar, backing vocals
Johnny Dee - drums

Production
Peter Humphreys - mastering

References

Britny Fox albums
2003 albums
Spitfire Records albums